French Guiana elects a legislature on the regional and departmental level. The legislature consists of two councils with diverging powers. The Regional Council (Conseil régional) has 31 members, elected for a four-year term by proportional representation. The General Council (Conseil général) has members elected for a six-year term in single-seat constituencies. 
French Guiana has a multi-party system, with numerous parties in which no one party often has a chance of gaining power alone, and parties must work with each other to form coalition governments.

Last elections

2004 Regional Elections

Seats

Past elections

1998 Regional election

1992 Regional election

1986 Regional election

See also
 Electoral calendar
 Electoral system